Vladimir Golovin (born 21 March 1970) is a former handball player and the current head coach of the Hungarian women's national team.

Born in Odessa, Soviet Union, Golovin moved to Hungary in 1992 and since then obtained the Hungarian citizenship. In Hungary he played for Szolnoki KC, Kiskőrös KSK, Százhalombattai KE, Hargita KC and in his final years for Dabasi KC.

His coaching career began at the men's team of Százhalombatta, subsequently he coached women's teams, including Kispesti NKK, Bugyi SE and Ferencvárosi TC. Initially a youth coach in Ferencváros, he soon was promoted to assistant coach and was part of the back-to-back EHF Cup Winners' Cup winner team in 2011 and 2012. During this period he also acted as the assistant coach of the Hungarian women's junior national team that won the bronze medal at the 2012 Women's Junior World Handball Championship.

In 2012 he took the head coach position at Kiskunhalasi NKSE and under his management the team produced one of the surprise performances in the 2012–13 season. At the end of the season he was signed by Siófok KC to replace Szilárd Kiss, who became the youth director of the club. Between April 2015 and November 2021 he was the head coach of MTK Budapest.

In March 2018 he took over the head coach position at Hungary women's national junior handball team from János Hajdu. With his lead the team won the 2018 Junior World Handball Championship, which was the very first title of the Hungarian national junior team. One year later, the team won the Junior European Championship.

Achievements
Coach
IHF Women's Junior World Championship:
: 2018
European Women's U-19 Handball Championship:
: 2019

References

1970 births
Living people
Sportspeople from Odesa
Hungarian male handball players
Hungarian handball coaches
Ukrainian male handball players
Ukrainian emigrants to Hungary
Handball coaches of international teams